Shady Grove is a Washington Metro station in Derwood in Montgomery County, Maryland, United States. The station was opened on December 15, 1984 as part of a four-stop extension of the line from  station out to Shady Grove. The station is operated by the Washington Metropolitan Area Transit Authority (WMATA).

Serving as the northwestern terminus of the Red Line, it is the most distant Metro station from downtown Washington, D.C. in Maryland. The station is the location of the Shady Grove Yard, one of the largest storage yards in the Metrorail system.

Location

Despite its name, Shady Grove station is located within the unincorporated community of Derwood; it takes its name from Shady Grove Road to the north. Much of the surrounding area is industrial or low-density residential in nature, although Rockville Road to the south contains strips of commercial activity. To the west is MD 355 (Frederick Road), a continuation of Rockville Pike, which the Red Line parallels throughout much of its route in western Montgomery County; MD 200A connects the Shady Grove station to I-370 and MD 200, better known as the Intercounty Connector. a toll road extending east to I-95.

The station is the northernmost station in the Washington Metro system, and is approximately equidistant from downtown Washington, D.C. and Frederick. It also the most distant Metro station (by straight-line distance) from the Washington Monument in Maryland.

Transit-oriented development
In order to cope with increasing population growth and subsequent traffic congestion while combating urban sprawl, the Montgomery County Planning Department released the Shady Grove Sector Plan, which aims to act as a guideline for mixed-use growth around the station. The plan emphasises high-density residential and commercial properties within the immediate vicinity of Shady Grove station, with a steady transition to low-density as the distance from the station increases.

The Sector Plan divides the surrounding area into five districts: Metro North, Metro East, Metro West, Metro South, and Jeremiah Park. Combined, there will be over 6,000 residential units within walking distance of Shady Grove station. In addition, the plan encourages the creation of a walkable street grid with defined main streets integrated with a comprehensive open space and park system.

History

In 1996, this station was the site of the Washington Metro's second fatal accident when a train arriving at the station overshot the platform and collided with a parked train awaiting assignment, killing the operator of the moving train. The Washington Post reported that the striking train was two months overdue for scheduled brake maintenance. A degradation of brake performance could have played a role in the crash. The crash, which occurred during the Blizzard of 1996, was caused by a failure in the train's Automatic Train Control system.

In 2011, as part of a preliminary study, the WMATA examined the possibility of extending the Red Line past the Shady Grove station and to the Metropolitan Grove station by 2040.

From September 11, 2021 to January 16, 2022, this station was closed due to the Rockville Canopy Replacement Project at Rockville station. The station reopened on January 16, 2022.

Station layout
The station has one island platform located west of the CSX Metropolitan Subdivision tracks, which carry Amtrak and MARC Trains. There is extensive parking available at this station: a surface lot to the west, and two garages and two surface lots to the east. Access between the platform and parking areas is provided by underpass, located at ground level on the east side and a short escalator below ground level on the west side. Each side of the station also contains a small kiss and ride lot.

References

External links

Derwood, Maryland
Stations on the Red Line (Washington Metro)
Railway stations in Montgomery County, Maryland
Washington Metro stations in Maryland
Railway stations in the United States opened in 1984
1984 establishments in Maryland